Curtis Hodgson (born August 12, 1981 in Burnaby, British Columbia) is a former professional lacrosse defenseman for the Washington Stealth of the National Lacrosse League, where he won the Champions Cup.

Hodgson earned a Bachelor's degree from Simon Fraser University where he played lacrosse for four seasons. He is currently a teacher at Burnaby Central  Secondary School where he also serves as co-athletic director and teaches Social Studies and Physical Education.

He won two Minto Cup Championships with the Burnaby Junior A Lakers in 2000 and 2002.

NLL career
In the 2008 Season, with the Stealth, he scored four goals and added 10 assists for 14 points. His 95 loose balls were good for third on the team.

In 2010, Hodgson was a member of the Stealth when they won the Champions Cup. In 2011 and 2013, Hodgson returned to the finals with the Stealth but lost.

He retired from the NLL on October 3, 2017. The stealth retired his jersey, which was the first time they had done that in their team’s history.

WLA career 
Hodgson currently plays for the New Westminster Salmonbellies in the Western Lacrosse Association (WLA). He was selected as the winner of the Gord Nicholson Trophy as the league's top defenseman in both 2007 and 2008. Further, he has been a four-time, first-team All-WLA selection (2005, 2006, 2007 and 2008).

Statistics

NLL
Reference:

WLA

References

1981 births
Canadian lacrosse players
Living people
San Jose Stealth players
Sportspeople from Burnaby